Reticulitermes hesperus, the western subterranean termite, is a species of termite in the family Rhinotermitidae. It is found in Central America and North America.

Ecology
Adults and nymphs are preyed on by the larvae of the lacewing Lomamyia latipennis. The lacewing lays its eggs on stumps and rotten logs and the newly hatched larvae make their way to termite galleries via crevices. Having found a termite, the first instar larva waves its abdomen and releases an allomone which paralyses the termite in two to three minutes; it then consumes the termite. Second and third instar lacewing larvae can subdue several termites at the same time.

References

Further reading

 

Termites
Articles created by Qbugbot
Insects described in 1920